Geoffrey Frank Norcott (born 16 December 1976) is an English comedian, writer and political commentator. He first performed in 2001 and has appeared on Mock the Week, Live at the Apollo and Question Time, and written for The Daily Telegraph, The Independent and Spiked.

Early life

Norcott was raised in South London. His father was a draughtsman for British Telecom and an active trade unionist. His parents divorced when he was nine, and his mother moved with him and his elder sister to a council estate in Mitcham.

He attended Southfields Secondary School, before moving to Rutlish School in Merton Park, the same school attended by Conservative Prime Minister John Major.

Norcott holds an English degree from Goldsmiths, University of London, and worked as an English teacher.

Early career
Norcott performed at his first comedy gig in September 2001, initially performing as a way of supplementing his teaching income.

In 2005, Norcott was approached to appear on radio and television, as a panellist and presenter on shows for Talksport, Nuts TV and the BBC.

He received an Operational Service Medal for five frontline tours entertaining the troops in Afghanistan.

Recent career

In 2013, Norcott was nominated for 'Best New Show' at the Leicester Comedy Festival for his show Geoff Norcott Occasionally Sells Out, about – among other things – the fact he was now a Conservative voter, which he then took to the Edinburgh Fringe.

He returned to the Fringe in 2015 with The Look of Moron, a further development of his voice as a political comic, and again in 2016 with Conswervative, which received wide political acclaim and a successful sold-out run.

In early 2017, Norcott made his first of several appearances on the BBC's Question Time and made his debut as a regular on BBC Two's The Mash Report, a programme he continued to appear on, including after 2021 when it relocated to Dave post-cancellation.

Norcott took another show, Right Leaning, But Well Meaning, to the Fringe the same year to further acclaim, and the show was later recorded as a radio special for BBC Radio 4, airing in 2018.

In 2018, he made his first appearance on Live at the Apollo, and took a new show, Traditionalism on a UK tour.

Later the same year, Norcott appeared on Mock the Week for the first time, being the first openly pro-Brexit comedian on the show.

He has also appeared on several UK political debate shows, including Politics Live and Daily Politics.

Norcott has written for a number of UK television shows, including A League of Their Own, 8 Out of 10 Cats Does Countdown and Frankie Boyle's New World Order.

A 2019 appearance on Question Time prompted another online backlash for Norcott, after a clip of him criticising European Union President Donald Tusk went viral. The same year, he presented the BBC Two documentary How The Middle Classes Ruined Britain, in which he investigated issues like how some people 'gamed' the system to secure places in good schools, and accusations of social cleansing in housing.

2019 also saw Norcott become the first white male to join the BBC's diversity panel, by virtue of his working class background. He has spoken of the irony of having, as a "straight, white, middle-aged man", taken advantage of diversity quotas to further his career.

In November 2020, it was announced that Norcott would be publishing a memoir entitled Where Did I Go Right?, in which he "unpicks his working-class upbringing and his political journey". The book (and audio-book, voiced by Norcott) was released in May 2021 to mixed reception. In a three-star review in the Daily Telegraph, critic Dominic Cavendish described it as a "frank, light-hearted account of how Norcott came from working-class origins in south London to forge a career in comedy" as well as "a sober mapping of the changing political landscape".

Podcast 
In February 2019, Norcott launched a podcast entitled What Most People Think, in which he aims to "get to the heart of what ordinary people think about social and political issues". Now recorded weekly, the podcast is funded by Patreon donations from listeners. Norcott claims to have refused approaches from would-be advertisers so as to avoid the risk of his content being influenced or censored. The podcast has been described by The Times as "amiably polemical".

Many of the episodes have featured interviews with guests, including fellow comedians David Baddiel, Katherine Ryan, Romesh Ranganathan, Andrew Doyle, Henning Wehn, Marcus Brigstocke, Simon Evans, Konstantin Kisin, Seann Walsh, Dominic Frisby and Leo Kearse. Outside of comedy, other guests have included journalists Owen Jones and Garry Bushell, actor turned political activist Lawrence Fox, and trade unionist Paul Embery.

Regular minor features which supplement the interviews include a "cuss count" in which Norcott recounts the number of swear words used in the previous episode; a letters section in which observations from listeners are discussed; and a final segment in which Norcott shares recent reviews left for the podcast on iTunes. In reading out listener contributions, Norcott often adopts exaggerated regional accents reflecting whichever part of the country the correspondent come from.

Personal life

Norcott lives in Cambridgeshire with his wife Emma, whom he married in 2004. In 2014 the couple's daughter Connie, was still-born at 34 weeks, Norcott has spoken openly of their loss and in May 2021 on an episode of Cariad Lloyd's Griefcast podcast.  The couple now have a son named Sebastian.

Norcott describes himself as a "right-wing libertarian". He has previously claimed to be the only outspoken Conservative Party supporter on the British comedy circuit and more recently suggested that he is one of only "about six" right wing comedians.

In 2017, he was listed as one of the 'Top 100 Most Influential People on the Conservative Right'.

Live tours
 Conswervative (2016)
 Right Leaning But Well Meaning (2017)
 Traditionalism (2018)
 Taking Liberties (2020)
 I Blame The Parents (2021)

Television credits
 Would I Lie To You! BBC One, 2020
 Question Time, BBC One, 2017 – 2019
 The Jeremy Vine Show, Channel 5, 2019
 The Wright Stuff, Channel 5, 2018
 Live at The Apollo, BBC, 2018
 Mock the Week, BBC Two, 2018
 Dave’s Advent Calendar, Dave, 2018
 Politics Live, BBC Two, 2018
 The Blame Game, BBC One Northern Ireland, 2017
 Edinburgh Nights, BBC Two, 2017
 Comedy Bigmouths, My5, 2017
 The Mash Report, BBC Two, 2017–2021
 Daily Politics, BBC, 2017
 All Out Politics, Sky News, 2017 – present
 Countdown, Channel 4, 2022

Radio credits
 Right Leaning But Well Meaning, BBC Radio 4
 Good Week, Bad Week, BBC Radio 5Live
 The Now Show, BBC Radio 4
 Loose Ends, BBC Radio 4
 Breaking the News, Radio Scotland
 The News Quiz, BBC Radio 4

Writing credits
 Have I Got News For You, BBC One
 King Gary, BBC Two
 Xmas Live at the Apollo, BBC Two
 8 Out of 10 Cats Does Countdown, Channel 4
 Judge Romesh, Dave
 A League of Their Own, Sky 1
 The Sarah Millican Television Programme, BBC Two
 Roast Battle, Comedy Central
 Katherine Ryan Stand-up Show, JFL
 Frankie Boyle’s New World Order, BBC Two
 The Misadventures of Romesh, BBC Two
 Fake News, Channel 4
 Safeword, ITV 2
 8 Out of 10 Cats, Channel 4
 Round Earth, BBC Worldwide
 The Outlaws, BBC
 The Weakest Link, BBC (2021 version)

References

External links
 
 Chortle page, with tour dates
 

21st-century English comedians
Conservative Party (UK) people
English libertarians
English male comedians
English stand-up comedians
English television presenters
Living people
People educated at Rutlish School
1976 births